Hazelton is a city in Emmons County, North Dakota, United States. The population was 223 at the 2020 census.

History
Hazelton was founded in 1902. Hazelton was named after Hazel, John Roop's daughter.

To combat population loss, city leaders of Hazelton have offered free land and start up money for people to move there .

Geography
Hazelton is located at  (46.484278, -100.278811).

Demographics

2010 census
As of the census of 2010, there were 235 people, 107 households, and 61 families residing in the city. The racial makeup of the city was 97.4% White, 2.1% Native American, and 0.4% from two or more races. Hispanic or Latino of any race were 1.7% of the population.

There were 107 households, of which 22.4% had children under the age of 18 living with them, 45.8% were married couples living together, 7.5% had a female householder with no husband present, 3.7% had a male householder with no wife present, and 43.0% were non-families. 40.2% of all households were made up of individuals, and 22.4% had someone living alone who was 65 years of age or older. The average household size was 2.20 and the average family size was 2.95.

The median age in the city was 46.9 years. 24.3% of residents were under the age of 18; 5% were between the ages of 18 and 24; 18.3% were from 25 to 44; 25.9% were from 45 to 64; and 26.4% were 65 years of age or older. The gender makeup of the city was 51.5% male and 48.5% female.

2000 census
As of the census of 2000, there were 237 people, 117 households, and 62 families residing in the city. The population density was 988.5 people per square mile (381.3/km). There were 129 housing units at an average density of 538.0 per square mile (207.5/km). The racial makeup of the city was 100.00% White. Hispanic or Latino of any race were 1.27% of the population.

There were 117 households, out of which 21.4% had children under the age of 18 living with them, 47.9% were married couples living together, 2.6% had a female householder with no husband present, and 47.0% were non-families. 46.2% of all households were made up of individuals, and 29.9% had someone living alone who was 65 years of age or older. The average household size was 2.03 and the average family size was 2.90.

In the city, the age distribution of the population shows 22.4% under the age of 18, 3.8% from 18 to 24, 19.4% from 25 to 44, 24.5% from 45 to 64, and 30.0% who were 65 years of age or older. The median age was 49 years. For every 100 females, there were 99.2 males. For every 100 females age 18 and over, there were 97.8 males.

As of 2000 the median income for a household was $17,778, and the median income for a family was $31,250. Males had a median income of $25,000 versus $15,625 for females. The per capita income for the city was $12,152. About 17.9% of families and 20.0% of the population were below the poverty line, including 17.9% of those under the age of eighteen and 25.0% of those 65 or over.

Climate
This climatic region is typified by large seasonal temperature differences, with warm to hot (and often humid) summers and cold (sometimes severely cold) winters.  According to the Köppen Climate Classification system, Hazelton has a humid continental climate, abbreviated "Dfb" on climate maps.

References

Cities in North Dakota
Cities in Emmons County, North Dakota
Populated places established in 1902
1902 establishments in North Dakota